This is a list of notable people connected to Gothenburg, Sweden.

A–M

 Davida Afzelius-Bohlin (1866–1955) mezzo-soprano concert and opera singer
 Daniel Alfredsson retired NHL hockey player; long time captain of the Ottawa Senators and forward for the Detroit Red Wings; played from 1991 to 2014
 Helen Alfredsson professional golfer; winner, 1993 Nabisco Dinah Shore
 Ingelin Angerborn children's author
 Margareta Arvidsson  Miss Sweden 1966, Miss Universe 1966
 Bjorn Ulvaeussinger-songwriter; member of ABBA
 Jenny Berggren singer-songwriter; founding member of Ace of Base
 Jonas Berggren singer-songwriter; founding member of Ace of Base
 Linn Berggren singer-songwriter; founding member of Ace of Base
 Joel Berghult commonly known as Roomie; musician and YouTuber
 Torsten Billman (1909–1989) artist
 Poul Bjerre (1876–1964) psychoanalyst
 Viktor Blom  poker player
 Colin Campbell Scottish merchant and entrepreneur; co-founder of Swedish East India Company
 Arvid Carlsson winner, Nobel Prize in Medicine (2000)
 William Chalmers (1748–1811) manager of Swedish East India Company; founder of Chalmers University of Technology
 Sir William Chambers (1723–1796) Scottish architect
 Ulf Dageby rock musician
 John Darnielle American singer-songwriter; wrote songs about Gothenburg
 Mikkey Dee heavy-metal drummer
 Beatrice Dickson (1852–1941) pioneering temperance activist
 Christian Djoos NHL player, Anaheim Ducks
 Karin Dreijer singer-songwriter
 Olof Dreijer musician
 Gustavo Dudamel Venezuelan conductor
 Ulf Ekberg singer-songwriter; founding member of Ace of Base
 Hedda Ekman (1860–1929), writer and photographer
 Jan Eliasson former Swedish Minister of Foreign Affairs
 Loui Eriksson National Hockey League player, Vancouver Canucks
 Louise Falkenberg (1849–1934) philanthropist
 José González musician
 Emma Green high Jumper, bronze medallist at the 2005 World Athletics Championships 
 Lennart Green world-class magician
 Gunnar Gren footballer; part of the Milan Gre-No-Li and 1958 FIFA World Cup runners-up squad
Andreas Gustafsson (born 1981) - race walker
 Bengt Hallberg jazz pianist
 Victor Hasselblad industrialist; creator, Hasselblad cameras
 Håkan Hellström singer-songwriter
 Zeth Höglund founder of the Swedish communist movement
 Glenn Hysén former football player, IFK Göteborg; father of Tobias Hysén
 Tobias Hysén football player; son of Glenn Hysén
 Ingemar Johansson boxer; World Heavyweight Champion, 1959
 Jan Johansson jazz pianist; attended Chalmers University of Technology
 Kim Källström football player; plays for Grasshopper Club Zürich in the Swiss Super League
 Marie Kinnberg (1806–1858) pioneering female photographer
 Felix Kjellberg  YouTuber commonly known as PewDiePie; producer of Let's Play (video gaming) and Reaction (reaction videos) videos on YouTube Second channel to reach 100 million subscribers. Husband of Marzia Kjellberg
 Carl Klingberg National Hockey League player, Winnipeg Jets; American Hockey League player, St. John's IceCaps
 John Klingberg National Hockey League player, Anaheim Ducks;
 Jacques Labouchere singer-songwriter and guitarist 
 Jens Lekman singer-songwriter
Beatrice Lesslie (1890–1967), ran the Gothenburg clothing firm Konfektions AB Lesslie
 Christina Lindberg exploitation-film actress
 Gunnel Lindblom actress and director; cast in Ingmar Bergman's films
 Adam Lindgren also known as Armada; professional Super Smash Bros. Melee player; currently ranked #2 in the world
 Mikael Ljungberg Greco-Roman wrestler; world champion 1993 and 1995; Olympic gold 2000
 Teddy Lučić Football player, formerly of the Swedish national team
 Henrik Lundqvist NHL goalie
 Ludvig Engsund Swedish ice hockey goaltender
 Aleksandra Mir visual artist
 Kwame Amoateng footballer
 Rekkles  professional e-Sport player

N–Z

 Torbjörn Nilsson former IFK Göteborg football player; part of the 1982 UEFA Cup winning team
 Stefan Olsdal  bassist in alternative rock band Placebo
 Christian Olsson (born 1980) triple-jump gold medalist, 2004 Summer Olympics
 Elena Paparizou Greek singer; winner, Eurovision Song Contest 2005
 Amanda Peralta (1939–2009), Argentine guerrilla fighter, later historian in Gothenburg University
 Sofia von Porat cookbook author
 Laleh Pourkarim Persian-Swedish singer-songwriter
 Timo Räisänen indie-pop musician
 Mathias Ranégie  football player for Sweden National Team
 Lucas Raymond  NHL player for the Detroit Red Wings
 Arie Reich  Israeli legal scholar
 Niclas Sahlgren merchant and philanthropist
 Marcus Samuelsson chef
 Torgny Segerstedt anti-Nazi newspaper editor-in-chief
 Justus P Sjöberg (JP Seeburg) automated musical equipment manufacturer
 Jonas Sjöstedt leader of Vänsterpartiet and former member of European Parliament
 Stellan Skarsgård actor
 Bedřich Smetana Czech composer; lived in Gothenburg for a time
 Jonatan Söderström avant-garde game developer
 Viktor Stalberg National Hockey League player, Chicago Blackhawks
 Wilhelm Stenhammar composer
 Henrik Stenson professional golfer; won FedEx Cup 2013; former world number 2 in official world golf rankings
 Elizabeth Stride (née Gustafsdotter) (1843–1888) alleged third victim of serial killer Jack the Ripper
 Glenn Strömberg former football player, IFK Göteborg
 Joakim Sundström sound editor, sound designer and musician
 Jonas Svensson professional tennis player
 Evert Taube author, artist, composer and singer
 Reorus Torkillus first Lutheran minister in New Sweden
 Björn Ulvaeus singer-songwriter from ABBA
 Karl Valentin composer
 Alicia Vikander actress
 Ljubomir Vranjes former handball player; currently handball coach
 Daniel Wahlgren (Papa Dee) musician
 Anna Wåhlin Antarctic researcher, oceanography professor
 Hampus Wanne handball player; currently plays for SG Flensburg-Handewitt
 Oscar Wendt football player; currently plays for Borussia Mönchengladbach

Musical groups

 Ace of Base pop group
 Amaranthe dance/electronic power metal group
 Arch Enemy melodic-death-metal group
 At the Gates melodic-death-metal group
 AVATAR melodic-death-metal group
 Dark Tranquillity melodic-death-metal group
 Dead by April melodic-metalcore group
 Deathstars cybergoth industrial-metal group
 Evergrey progressive-metal group
 Freak Kitchen hard-rock/heavy-metal group
 Graveyard retro blues-rock band
 HammerFall power-metal group
 The Haunted thrash-metal band
 In Flames melodic-death-metal group
 The Knife electro duo
 Little Dragon  electronic-pop group
 Nostradameus  power-metal group
 The Similou electronic-music group
 The Soundtrack of Our Lives rock group

See also

 List of Swedish people

Gothenburg